The Roswell Daily Record is a local newspaper located in Roswell, New Mexico, and has a circulation of less than 12,000. The paper is well known in the UFO community because it reported the alleged Roswell UFO crash in 1947. The newspaper was previously owned by Robert Beck, and after Beck’s death the newspaper ownership was passed to the Beck Trust - Marjorie S Beck.

See also
List of newspapers in New Mexico

External links
Official website

References 

Newspapers published in New Mexico
Mass media in Roswell, New Mexico
Publications established in 1891
1891 establishments in New Mexico Territory